"Sweet Mother" is a highlife song by the Cameroonian and Nigerian singer Prince Nico Mbarga and his band Rocafil Jazz. Released in 1976, it remains one of the most popular songs in Africa.

The demo-tape of "Sweet Mother" was turned down by EMI in 1974, citing the song's "childish appeal." "Sweet Mother" was later also rejected by Decca Records and Philips Records, before it was eventually released in December, 1976, by Rogers All Stars, a Nigerian recording company based in Onitsha.  

The song is a celebration of motherhood, sung in Nigerian Pidgin English. The music is West African highlife, with Congolese Soukous-style guitar finger-picking. 

"Sweet Mother" went on to become one of the most popular hits in Africa, selling over 13 million copies. Sometimes called Africa's anthem, it was voted Africa's favourite song by BBC readers and listeners in 2004, coming before Brenda Fassie's "Vuli Ndlela", Fela Kuti's "Lady", Franco's "Mario" and Miriam Makeba's version of "Malaika," which is a South African classic, sang by Dorothy Masuka in the fifties.

References

External links
Sweet Mother lyrics

Cameroonian music
Nigerian songs
Igbo highlife